Jonathan Kane (born November 4, 1956) is an American musician and composer. Coming out of New York's Downtown Music scene of the early 1980s, Kane is known for his work with minimalist composers La Monte Young and Rhys Chatham, and was a founding member of NYC band Swans. He also leads his own minimalist blues band called Jonathan Kane's February.

Kane began his professional career while in high school in 1974. Along with his brother, harmonica player Anthony Kane, they formed the Kane Brothers Blues Band. They worked at east coast USA clubs and opened concerts for James Cotton, Willie Dixon, Dr. John, Koko Taylor, and Muddy Waters, amongst others.

Other groups and artists Kane has toured and recorded with includes Dave Soldier, The Kropotkins, Gary Lucas, Transmission, Elliott Sharp, Soldier String Quartet, John Zorn, Jean-Francois Pauvros, Jac Berrocal, and Tony Hymas. He  also composed music for choreographers Bebe Miller, Lisa Fox and Wally Cardona.

Kane has released two solo albums, February (2004) and Jet Ear Party (2009), and also an EP, The Little Drummer Boy (2007).

Timeline
1974 - 1977 - Kane Bros. Blues Band
1977 - 1979 - Attends Berklee College of Music in Boston, MA
1980 - 1981 - NYC post punk band Circus Mort with future Swans front man Michael Gira
1981 - 1983 - Forms Swans with Michael Gira, forms Transmission with Daniel Galliduani, tours USA with Swans/Sonic Youth 'Savage Blunder Tours', tours with Rhys Chatham on "Kitchen Tour USA 1"
1984 - 1988 - Composes and arranges for choreographers Bebe Miller and Lisa Fox
1988 - 2009 - World premier in 1988 of Rhys Chatham's symphony for 100 electric guitars 'An Angel Moves Too Fast To See' features Kane as the only drummer. Tours worldwide.
1991 - 2000 - Member of La Monte Young's 'Forever Bad Blues Band' performing Young's 3+ hour piece 'Young's Dorian Blues in G'. Tours worldwide.
1994–present - Forms The Kropotkins with Dave Soldier, Moe Tucker, Lorette Velvette and Charles Burnham.
2005–present - Forms Jonathan Kane's February, tours USA and Europe, releases 5 records/cds on Table of the Elements label and Issue Project Room Editions. Band members have included Igor Cubrilovic (producer), Peg Simone, Jon Crider, David Bicknell, Adam Wills (Bear In Heaven), Eric Eble, Ernie Brooks (Modern Lovers), David Daniell, and Paul Duncan.
2010–present - Joins X Patsy's with artists Robert Longo, Jon Kessler and actress Barbara Sukowa. Tours Europe
2012–present - Forms Soldier Kane with Dave Soldier

Personal life
Jonathan Kane is the son of American photographer Art Kane, and has two brothers, Anthony and Nikolas. In 1993, he married poet and lyricist Holly Anderson, and the couple's daughter, Lucy, was born later the same year. His wife died in 2017, from cancer linked to her work as a volunteer following the 9/11 terrorist attacks in New York.

References

1956 births
Living people
Swans (band) members
American male composers
20th-century American composers
Noise rock musicians
20th-century American drummers
American male drummers